Kadakkal is a historic town located in the eastern part of Kollam district, Kerala.

History
Kadakkal was where one of the notable movements of the Indian independence movement, the Kadakkal Riot Case, led by Franco Raghavan Pillai, took place.

Economy
Kadakkal is an important business centre, containing businesses such as Kadakkal Chantha Market which sell goods such as coconut, areca nut, copra, tapioca and rubber.

Demographics
As of the 2001 census, Kadakkal has a population of 45,291, with 21,749 males and 23,542 females.

Transport 

The nearest airport is Trivandrum International Airport.

References

External links 

Kadakkal Amma
Kadakkal Online
wikimapia kadakkal

Cities and towns in Kollam district